Kandos is a small town in the Central Tablelands of New South Wales, Australia, within Mid-Western Regional Council. The area is the traditional home of the Dabee tribe, of the Wiradjuri people. The town sits beneath Cumber Melon Mountain (from the Aboriginal name Combamolang), in a district formerly known as Coomber. Kandos shares its locality, employment and infrastructure with the neighbouring town Rylstone, 6 kilometres away. At the 2021 census, Kandos had a population of 1263.

History

Company town 
The NSW Cement Lime and Coal Company was registered in May 1913, and floated in August that year to build a cement industry. The company purchased 100 acres from local farmer John Lloyd junior for £2000 on which to establish an industry and town. The industrial infrastructure was built during the first three years. Limestone was lifted from a nearby quarry and transported via an aerial ropeway. Coal and shale were mined nearby. Dams, a rail siding, railway station, stacks, silos and power house were built, kilns imported and machinery installed. Cement production began in August 1916. It took longer than anticipated to establish the industry because the first plant, supplied by Krupp Ltd Germany, was interned at Portuguese West Africa at the outbreak of the First World War, thus requiring General Manager Frank Oakden to sail to America and England to order another plant.

James Dawson, local surveyor and landowner, was contracted by the cement company to survey the first town subdivision and most subdivisions thereafter. At the first land sale at Kandos on 14 August 1915, 200 business and residential sites were auctioned. Local pastoralist Hunter White of Havilah paid an exceptionally high price of £2700 for land set aside for a hotel on the corner of Angus Avenue and White Crescent. The land attracted that price because the company put a caveat on all land titles, to prevent the building of another hotel. White, a large investor in the company and soon to be a company director, later onsold to Tooth & Company. Over ten years, various attempts were made to obtain another hotel licence on non-company land. Each time it was opposed in the licensing courts.

In 1926 a licence for a second hotel was finally granted to William Morgan, for the Railway Hotel. It was built on Ilford Road on a crown subdivision, which was unaffected by the cement company's caveat.

Kandos was originally named Candos, an acronym, it is believed, of company officials. In 1915 the Post Master General deemed that the name Candos was too similar to Chandos in South Australia, and the name was changed to Kandos.

The streets in the first subdivision were also named after company officials: Angus Avenue (James Angus, chairman) Buchanan Street (Edward Buchanan master builder); White Crescent (Hunter White local pastoralist); Rodgers Street (Colin Rodgers financier); Jaques Street (Charles Jaques solicitor); McDonald Street (George McDonald politician); Noyes Street (Edward Noyes engineering consultant); Davies Road (Lewis Davis shipping merchant). All were successful city capitalists.

20th-century town 
Kandos is a rare 20th-century town, most NSW towns having been established in the nineteenth century. It began as a private village but was proclaimed an urban area on 11 January 1918 and came under the control of Rylstone Shire Council.

All buildings in the town of Kandos, except for the original public school behind the Police Station, were built after 1915. There are several buildings of architectural interest. Kandos Museum, formerly the Methodist Church, was designed by works manager, Floyd S Richards, in the Californian Mission Style of his hometown church in America. It is on the Australian Heritage Database. St Dominic's Convent was built in the Spanish Mission Style for the Good Samaritan nuns. Both are in contrast to the modernist functional Kandos Community Centre, while the Band Rotunda, built entirely of cement, is a temple-like structure in the classical revival style.

It is believed Kandos was the first place in Australia to have concrete electricity poles, when early in 1920 the cement works supplied electricity to light Angus Avenue, Kandos Hotel, Angus Memorial Hall, businesses in the main street, the railway station and station master's cottage.

Kandos helped build NSW 
Kandos brands itself as "the town that made the cement that made your town". Kandos cement was used in roads, bridges, reservoirs, stacks, tanks, pipes, posts, paths, fences and buildings. It was used for roof tiles, asbestos sheets and ash bricks. Kandos also supplied the cement for construction of Sydney Harbour Bridge as well as other city infrastructure, including the underground railway between Central and St James, Lane Cove Road, Glebe Island Wheat Silos, The Royal Automobile Club, Mark Foys additions, as well as the Opera House.

Migrants helped build Kandos 
Many migrants contributed to the growth of Kandos. The first chairman (James Angus), managing director (Frank Oakden), works manager (Floyd Richards), chief engineer (Vilhelm Langevad) and architect (Stanley Jeffreys) were all migrants. In the 1920s migrants opened businesses and worked for the company. It is estimated that around 400 newly arrived migrants, mainly refugees, were living in and around Kandos in the 1950s and 1960s, coming mainly from Eastern Europe including Poland, Italy, Slovenia, Greece, Ukraine, Estonia, Hungary and Lithuania. Today, migrants from the Middle East and Asia make an important contribution. The clock in the main street was donated by a group of migrants, who were naturalised in 1958.

Population 
At the 2021 Census, there were 1263 people in Kandos. 77.6% of people were born in Australia and 84.5% of people spoke only English at home. The most common responses for religion were No Religion 29.6%, Anglican 26.9%, and Catholic 19.3%.

Economy

Cement industry closed 
The cement manufacturing facility and associated limestone quarry (both operated by Cement Australia) were closed in September 2011. Another major industry in the region was coal-mining. Centennial Coal operated the Charbon coal mine until its closure. The underground mine closed in March 2014, while open cut mining continued until 2015.

Industrial employment opportunities 
Opportunities for industrial employment are, or are expected to be available soon, within an hour's drive: near Lithgow (Airly and Springvale coal mines); near Mudgee (Wilpinjong, Ulan and Moolarban coal mines and Wollar Power Station); near Ilford (Crudine Ridge Wind Farm); near Lue (Lue Silver Mine) and near Bylong (Kepco).

Other employment opportunities 
Employment opportunities are in:
Health: Rylstone Hospital, Health One Service, 2 aged care facilities, pharmacy, 3 doctors
Education: Kandos high school, 2 primary schools, pre-school
Hospitality: 3 clubs, 4 hotels, 2 motels; a scattering of small accommodation venues in or near the towns; a number of cafes

The larger than average IGA has a Deli, coffee and drinks bar, meat, fruit and vegetables, and liquor outlet. It trades seven days a week extended hours. Increasingly professionals are working from home and doing a city commute, weekly or less often.

Rare retail outlets 
A community shop, with funds distributed to the community.

Bespoke stores include Kosmos and Thistle and Ad Hoc furniture.  

Art and craft include Aboriginal Artists, the Kandos Krafters, potters, a goldsmith  and blacksmith, amongst others.

Transport

Road 
Kandos is about three hours drive from Sydney (via the Blue Mountains and Castlereagh Highway); and Newcastle (via Bylong Valley Way). It is within an hour's drive of three regional centres: Mudgee, Lithgow and Bathurst. There are two petrol stations and an electric vehicle charging facility.

Train and coach 
Kandos is on the Wallerawang to Gwabegar railway line. The section from Capertee to Rylstone was completed in 1884 and Kandos station was opened in 1915. Passenger rail closed in 1985 and daily coach services to Lithgow and Mudgee have operated since then.

On 24 October 2017 the NSW Government announced a $1.1 million grant to reinstate the 8 km rail link between Kandos and Rylstone. On 29 September 2018 the Kandos Rylstone Heritage Rail was opened by MP Paul Toole, while a special locomotive, the Garratt 6029, hauled eight carriages from Lithgow.

Air 
Rylstone Aerodrome Airpark 

Members own their individual freehold lots and share in the upkeep of the common property.

Tourism

Places to visit 
Ganguddy Dunns Swamp is a popular recreation area and lake in the Wollemi National Park, Ganguddy Dunns Swamp was formed when the cement company constructed a weir on the Cudgegong River to provide piped water to the cement works and town. Facilities include bushwalking tracks, picnic areas, camping sites, Aboriginal art, fishing and kayaking. It has 40,000 visitors a year.

Kandos Museum, formerly the Methodist Church, is built in Spanish Mission style and is listed on the Australian Heritage Database. There is an outdoor display of large industrial items. The museum contains a sizeable group of objects, photographs and information about the industrial, social and war history of the area. There is an electric vehicle charging facility at this location. Kandos Museum is the tourist information outlet.

Local Events 
Cementa is a biennial 4-day Contemporary Arts Festival which brings together more than 60 urban and regional artists who exhibit video, installation, sound, performance and 2D and 3D artworks in venues and locations across the town and its surrounds.

CWA Kandos Gardens Fair is a biennial weekend open gardens event, which showcases up to 12 town and country gardens in Kandos Rylstone and surrounds. Entertainment, demonstrations, talks, stalls and food are scattered throughout the gardens. https://www.facebook.com/KandosGardensFair

Kandos Street Machine and Hot Rod Show, similar to Summernats, which began in 1999, is held annually on a weekend on or near Australia Day. Their stated aim is 'To put on one of the most laid back and family friendly car shows around'.

The Rylstone Kandos Show is held annually in February at the Rylstone Showground.

Streetfeast is an annual long lunch held in the main street of Rylstone in early November. Stalls, shops and eateries also feature local produce, wines, art and craft.

Facilities 
Henbury Golf Course is a challenging 18-hole Championship Golf Course designed in the 1930s by two eminent golf architects. There are tennis courts and a putting green.

Kandos and District Memorial Olympic Swimming Pool is clean, heated and private. The children's paddling pool is covered and there is a modern amenities block and tuck shop.

Kandos Skate Park is situated beside the swimming pool.

Coomber Park in Angus Avenue and Rotary Park on Ilford Road have children's playgrounds, picnic areas and toilets. Other parks in the town with play equipment are Darton Park and a park on the corner of Noyes and Fleming Streets.

KRRfm 98.7 is a community radio station that broadcasts a wide range of programs, run by a team of volunteers, who entertain and inform listeners of local news and events.

Community Capers is a monthly Rylstone-Kandos district newsletter published by KRRfm giving information about local news and events.

Facilities

Education 
Kandos High School 

Kandos Primary School 

Rylstone Kandos Preschool

Rylstone Primary School

Health 
Two doctor practices service the two towns.

Kandos Family Medical Practice, 42 Davies Rd, Kandos; (02) 6379 4405

Kandos Advanced Medical Centre, 82 Rodgers Street, Kandos (02) 6379 4100 and at Rylstone Health One, Ilford Rd, Rylstone (02) 6357 6150

Rylstone Health One, Ilford Rd, Rylstone; (02) 6357 6150, provides nurse led clinics Monday to Friday 8.30am-5pm, for booked clients or home visits.  Services include assessments, wound care, pre-op ECG, health promotion activities such as falls prevention, chronic and complex case management, fitness classes.  A pathologist is available for blood collection, and visiting allied health services include physiotherapy, speech therapy, dietetics, dental and women's health.

Rylstone Hospital, Fitzgerald Street, Rylstone; 02 6357 6100. The hospital, which serves acute and emergency, also includes an aged care wing.

ADA Cottage Anzac Avenue, Kandos; (02) 6379 4709. Provides low and high care in a community of 19 residents.

Churches 
St Lawrence's Anglican Church corner Angus Avenue and Jaques Street

St Dominic's Catholic Church Dangar Avenue

One Life Church corner Dunn and Noyes Streets

References

External links
 
 
 
 Rylstone Kandos Tourism and Business
 Mudgee Region Tourism
 Local Government, Mid-Western Regional Council 
 Rylstone Rylstone, New South Wales

Towns in New South Wales
Central Tablelands
Mining towns in New South Wales